David J. Sirota (born November 2, 1975) is an American journalist, columnist at The Guardian, editor for Jacobin, author, television writer, and screenwriter. He is also a political commentator and radio host based in Denver. He is a nationally syndicated newspaper columnist, political spokesperson, and blogger. In March 2019, he began working as the senior advisor and speechwriter on the Bernie Sanders 2020 presidential campaign. In 2022, he received an Academy Award nomination for Best Original Screenplay for conceiving the story for Netflix's Don't Look Up alongside co-writer and director Adam McKay. He is founder of The Lever news outlet.

Early life and education
Sirota was born in New Haven, Connecticut, but grew up in the Montgomery County suburbs outside of Philadelphia, Pennsylvania. After being educated at the William Penn Charter School, he went to Northwestern University, where he earned a bachelor's degree with honors in journalism and political science. He has lived in various cities around the country including Philadelphia, Chicago, San Diego, Washington, D.C., Helena, and Denver.

Career

Politics
Sirota's career in political campaigns began when he was a research director for Illinois State Senator Howard W. Carroll's unsuccessful run for U.S. Representative in Illinois's 9th congressional district in the 1998 election; Carroll lost in the Democratic primary to Illinois State Representative Jan Schakowsky. In 1999, Sirota served as Dwight Evans's deputy mayoral campaign manager in Philadelphia. He was let go for "overzealous behavior" related to the creation of a fake website containing damaging racial comments attributed to Evans' opponent John White, Jr.. Evans said he believed that Sirota had not created the bogus page, but had discussed it with the person who created it, who was his friend and former college classmate at Northwestern. Sirota then became a fundraiser for Joe Hoeffel in his first successful campaign for the House of Representatives in Pennsylvania's 13th congressional district. Later he moved to Washington, D.C. and worked in the political department of the American Israel Public Affairs Committee (AIPAC). His next job was as press aide and spokesperson for Bernie Sanders while he was serving as the at-large U.S. Representative from Vermont.

Sirota worked as spokesperson for the House Appropriations Committee. While a fellow at the Center for American Progress, a liberal research and advocacy group, he created its Progress Report.

In 2003 Newsweek profiled Sirota as a "political operative" skilled at "hacking out a daily barrage of anti-Bush media clips, commentary, and snappy quotes" who made "guerrilla attacks on the Bush administration", and who was "well schooled in the art of Washington warfare." According to the article, Sirota's main weapons were computer emails. Sirota was described as the "Internet child of the Clinton War Room generation." Former Clinton White House chief of staff John Podesta said of Sirota: "I just saw he had an eye for critique and the instinct for the jugular." For example, Sirota unearthed a two-year-old comment that Colin Powell had made to the effect that "Iraq posed no threat to its neighbors, and possessed no 'significant capability' in weapons of mass destruction." Sirota made Powell's statements more widely known. Reporters pounced, and it became a public relations blow to the Bush administration. Sirota was credited with having revealed that $87 billion for Iraq could have been used to erase huge state deficits at home, a fact that was repeated by Democrats nationwide.

He served as a senior strategist for Brian Schweitzer's unsuccessful 2000 Senate campaign and successful 2004 gubernatorial campaign. In September 2006, Sirota worked as a political consultant for Ned Lamont's U.S. Senate campaign. Lamont defeated Joe Lieberman in the primary, but Lieberman ran as an independent and defeated Lamont in the November election. In 2008, Sirota was co-chair of the Progressive Legislative Action Network (now renamed the Progressive States Network). He was a senior fellow at the Campaign for America's Future.

Sanders campaign
On March 19, 2019, the Bernie Sanders 2020 presidential campaign announced it had hired Sirota to work as a senior advisor and speechwriter. Sirota was accused of launching attacks against Sanders's Democratic opponents on Twitter and through articles for The Guardian on behalf of the campaign as early as December. However, according to Sirota and The Guardian, the Sanders campaign did not engage in conversations related to his hiring until January. The Guardian spokeswoman Deepal Patadia said after they were informed about the conversations Sirota quit filing columns for The Guardian.

Sirota continued to contribute to Capital & Main and interviewed Washington Governor Jay Inslee, a Democrat who launched a 2020 presidential campaign. They talked about how Inslee planned to address the issue of climate change through his campaign. Once The Atlantic revealed that Sirota had been advising the Sanders campaign prior to his official hire, Capital & Main’s publisher told The Atlantic that “Capital & Main did not, and would never, knowingly allow Mr. Sirota or any reporter to use our site to advocate for or against a political candidate.”

On Twitter, Capital & Main stated on March 20, 2019,

Media
In May 2005, Sirota became a contributor to The Huffington Post while writing his own blog. He was a regular guest on The Al Franken Show and makes guest appearances on The Colbert Report, Countdown with Keith Olbermann, NOW, Lou Dobbs Tonight, CNBC, and NPR. He is a senior editor at In These Times, a regular columnist for The Nation and the Intermountain Jewish News, and a past contributor to The American Prospect. He has been published in The Washington Post, the Los Angeles Times, The Baltimore Sun, and the San Francisco Chronicle.

Sirota was a contributor to OpenLeft, a now-defunct progressive political blog. In June 2007, he replaced the late progressive columnist Molly Ivins with a column to be syndicated nationally by Creators Syndicate. Sirota became a contributing writer for Salon in May 2011.

From 2009 to 2012, Sirota was the morning host at the Denver progressive talk station KKZN. Sirota was initially filling in for Jay Marvin on his eponymous program; but Marvin was ultimately unable to return, and Sirota became the permanent host in 2010. Sirota also guest hosted for Thom Hartmann and Norman Goldman. On July 16, 2012, Sirota moved to sister station KHOW to co-host an afternoon drive program with former George W. Bush administration FEMA director Michael D. Brown, The Rundown with Sirota and Brown. In January 2013, after nearly four years in radio, Sirota parted ways with KHOW/Clear Channel. Insiders speculate the reason for the abrupt departure was friction between the two co-hosts; it left Brown with his own show.

In March 2017, Sirota joined The Young Turks online broadcast network as a contributor, providing periodic investigative reports. In early 2018, after four years of reporting for the International Business Times as senior editor of investigations, Sirota left that publication.

In May 2020, some weeks after ending his work with Bernie Sanders's 2020 campaign, Sirota joined Jacobin as editor-at-large.

Hostile Takeover
In May 2006, Random House's Crown Publishers released Sirota's book Hostile Takeover. The first chapter of the book was published in The New York Times in July 2006. Sirota read sections of his book in public. In the book, Sirota argued that corporate interests are driving U.S. economic policy. The book became a The New York Times bestseller on July 9, 2006, entering at #23 on the nonfiction list. The paperback edition came out a year later.

Sirota's Hostile Takeover (2006) was reviewed by The New York Times critic Tobin Harshaw who described Sirota as a "Montana-based blogger with a take-no-prisoners mind-set" with "an admirably organized mind". Harshaw applauded some Sirota suggestions as "admirably specific, occasionally realistic and arguably on the side of the angels" and capable of bipartisan support, such as his recommendations for "regulating malpractice insurance for doctors... restoring state control over class-action laws... (and) forcing chief executives to certify corporate tax returns so they face liability for fraud." He felt Sirota was critical of "mainstream Democratic centrists". Harshaw criticized the writing style as "cliched" and "oppressive" and too lengthy and needing an editor, but admitted Sirota presented a "creditable analysis."

Sirota responded to Harshaw's review in a letter to the editor. Sirota denied his book was critical of mainstream Democrats, but aimed squarely at "exposing Republican hypocrisy." He described his position as a "centrist exploration of the corruption of the entire system" that "isn't the fault of just one party or another."

There was controversy in Washington, D.C., in 2007 about whether Sirota was a "journalist" or an "activist". While the Washington press corps tends to see him as an "activist", at one point he was criticized for skirting the rules about access to Congress, which would on some occasions deny activists access, by getting a "temporary intern's ID"; this gave him access to the Senate chamber, but he was criticized in The Washington Post afterward. He was described as having "pulled an end-run around the press galleries." Sirota denied he got "special access" and that such a claim was "just bizarre". He added: "I think a lot of reporters on the Hill want to monopolize access to our government as a way to preserve their monopoly on news I guess." Some analysts observed that conservative journalists were activists as well; one noted "(Weekly Standard columnist) Fred Barnes has credentials, he espouses political views."

The Uprising
Sirota's book The Uprising was released in June 2008. It was ranked 20th on The New York Times bestseller list on June 15, 2008. The book was also listed on The New York Times Political Bestseller list for the month of July 2008. Sirota made speeches about his book at prestigious venues such as Hofstra University.

A mostly positive review of The Uprising from Publishers Weekly described the book as chronicling "how ordinary citizens on the right and the left are marshaling their frustrations with the government into uprisings across the country." The reviewer cited "entertaining case studies" with a "conversational" tone and a fast-paced narrative with "numerous high notes." Sirota gave a "fine elucidation of continuing Democratic support for the Iraq War" and examined the "echo chamber qualities of beltway television shows like Hardball." The book presents "a rousing account of the local uprisings already in effect."

A Newark Star-Ledger political critic reviewing the book described Sirota as an "enterprising" reporter who used "resourceful" tactics to get entry into such venues as Capitol Hill, the Microsoft campus, an ExxonMobil stockholders meeting, and the Mexican border. In the book, Sirota attacks CNN star Lou Dobbs less for his "endless broadcasts on illegal immigration" but more for the way he "browbeats his staff and runs roughshod over the CNN management." The critic felt the book's "search for a national uprising is somewhat out of focus" but was a "lively read."

Political views
Sirota is a critic of neoliberal economic policies, and has leveled criticism at the Clinton, George W. Bush, and Obama administrations. Sirota supported John Edwards in the 2008 Democratic party primaries. He has criticized the Democratic Leadership Council and other Democrats, who he claims have "sold out" to corporate interests, and has argued that the term "centrist" is a misnomer in that these politicians are out of touch with public opinion. Sirota's article "The Democrats' Da Vinci Code" argues that leftist politicians are more successful in so-called "red states" than the mainstream media have previously reported. He is an opponent of free trade policies, a supporter of fair trade, and an advocate of workers' rights and organized labor. His May 2007 speech at the Montana AFL–CIO Convention in Butte articulated many of his views. Sirota supported Sherrod Brown over Paul Hackett for the 2006 Senate election in Ohio and criticized Hackett's claims that he was "forced out" of the race by party elders as disingenuous. In 2008, Sirota stated on radio program Democracy Now! that he had cast an early vote for Democratic Party presidential candidate Barack Obama.

Sirota has been a strong supporter of the economic stimulus efforts of the Obama administration. However, he has criticized such efforts as insufficient and has strongly supported further stimulus efforts.

Sirota was criticized by Fox News hosts and commentators Mark Steyn, Bill O'Reilly, Greg Gutfeld, and Robert Spencer in the wake of the Boston Marathon bombing for an article he wrote for Salon entitled "Let's Hope the Boston Marathon Bomber Is a White American."

Some other journalists and political analysts have criticized Sirota. In his article comparing two approaches to progressive politics, statistician Nate Silver disparaged Sirota's approach as "playing fast and loose with the truth and using some of the same demagogic precepts that the right wing does." Regarding Sirota's political analysis and projections, including his predictions during the 2008 presidential election, Al Giordano derided him as "an inverted compass: when Sirota says 'heads,' you can make a lot of money betting on 'tails.'"

In 2016, right-wing commentators at the conservative National Review and libertarian Reason upbraided Sirota for his 2013 Salon article entitled "Hugo Chavez's economic miracle". Sirota wrote in 2013 that Chavez was "no saint", but also that his socialist and redistributionist policies had led to Venezuela's GDP more than doubling and reduced poverty to the third-lowest level in South America. His detractors charge that Sirota overlooked that Venezuela's economic gains were based almost entirely on petroleum exports, and with the worldwide drop in oil prices Venezuela's economy has been in shambles, with shortages and rationing of food, electricity, and toilet paper.

In 2018, Sirota argued immediate action must be taken against the influence and power of oil and gas corporations to fight climate change, and Democrats must choose a side. "Will our political class behold the fossil fuel industry's sociopathy and realize that we face an existential choice between profits and ecological survival?" asked Sirota.

Family
In January 2018, Sirota's wife, Emily, announced candidacy for a seat in the Colorado House of Representatives, promising a "bold, progressive agenda." In June, she won the Democratic primary in District 9, based in southeastern Denver. In November, she won the general election, with 72 percent of the vote to Republican Bob Lane's 28.

Depiction in fiction
Sirota was a schoolmate of television producer and writer Adam F. Goldberg. Sirota is a recurring minor character in the ABC television comedy The Goldbergs, which is based on Goldberg's childhood, portrayed by Sam Kindseth. The episode "Van People" was dedicated to Sirota and uses archive footage of Sirota during his time at William Penn Charter School. The episode also briefly featured his appearance on The Colbert Report.

Bibliography
Hostile Takeover: How Big Money and Corruption Conquered Our Government and How We Take It Back, 2006
The Uprising: An Unauthorized Tour of the Populist Revolt Scaring Wall Street and Washington, 2008
Back to Our Future: How the 1980s Explain the World We Live in Now—Our Culture, Our Politics, Our Everything, 2011

Filmography

References

External links

David Sirota's home page
David Sirota's syndicate website

1975 births
American bloggers
American people of Russian-Jewish descent
American political consultants
Bernie Sanders 2020 presidential campaign
HuffPost writers and columnists
Jewish American writers
Journalists from Montana
Living people
Northwestern University alumni
People from Helena, Montana
Radio personalities from Philadelphia
The Young Turks people
William Penn Charter School alumni